Coiro is a surname. Notable people with the surname include:

 Angie Coiro (21st century), American radio personality
 Eloisa Coiro (born 2000); Italian middle-distance runner
 Kat Coiro, American film director, producer, and screenwriter
 Rhys Coiro (born 1979), American television and stage actor

See also 

 Corio (surname)